Harry Shindle Wingert (August 17, 1865 – May 11, 1928) was an American football and basketball coach.  He served as the head football coach at Franklin & Marshall College in 1899 and at Temple University from 1901 to 1905, compiling a career college football record of 16–14–3.  Winger was also the head basketball coach at Franklin & Marshall for the 1899–1900 season and at Temple from 1901 to 1905, tallying a career college basketball mark of 20–19.  He later served as director of the student health services at Ohio State University.

Head coaching record

Football

References

External links
 

1865 births
1928 deaths
Basketball coaches from Pennsylvania
Franklin & Marshall Diplomats football coaches
Franklin & Marshall Diplomats men's basketball coaches
Ohio State University staff
Temple Owls football coaches
Temple Owls men's basketball coaches
Sportspeople from Lancaster, Pennsylvania